The Tester and Polin General Merchandise Store is located in Alma, Wisconsin.

History
Farmer traded locally-grown grain and produce for general merchandise at the store. It was listed on the National Register of Historic Places in 1979 and on the State Register of Historic Places in 1989.

References

Commercial buildings on the National Register of Historic Places in Wisconsin
National Register of Historic Places in Buffalo County, Wisconsin
Vernacular architecture in Wisconsin
Brick buildings and structures
Commercial buildings completed in 1861